The Ogarantim or  Ogaratim River, also known as the Fortaleza River, is a river of Rio Grande do Sul state in southern Brazil.

See also
List of rivers of Rio Grande do Sul

References

Rivers of Rio Grande do Sul